Paul Ernst Vilhelm Tirkkonen (9 October 1884 – 31 August 1968) was a lightweight Greco-Roman wrestler from Finland who won a bronze medal at the 1911 World Championships. Next year he competed at the 1912 Olympics, but was eliminated in the second round. His brother Theodor competed alongside, in a heavier weight category.

References

External links
 

1884 births
1968 deaths
Sportspeople from Helsinki
People from Uusimaa Province (Grand Duchy of Finland)
Finnish male sport wrestlers
Olympic wrestlers of Finland
Wrestlers at the 1912 Summer Olympics
World Wrestling Championships medalists